The Kitgwang Declaration was a coup by South Sudanese rebel commander Simon Gatwech Dual on August 4, 2021, in which he replaced First Vice President Riek Machar as leader of the Sudan People's Liberation Movement/Army in Opposition leading to a deadly rebel fighting  Since 2014, Gatwech has been the military chief of staff of the SPLM/SPLA (IO) and has grown hostile against Machar since the signing of the revitalized peace agreement in 2018.

Background 
Since the return of Machar to Juba from exile to form a unity government with President Salva Kiir Mayardit in February 2020, Dual has been speaking out against his boss for 'compromising' key provisions of the revitalized peace agreement signed in 2018 such as the security arrangements in which rival forces of the opposition and the government were to be unified to form a professional national army.

In October 2020, Gatwech wrote to the IGAD, the regional bloc which mediated the peace agreement that ended the war with Machar's appointment as first vice president in February 2020, asking for Machar's release in order to enable him to and brief his forces over the implementation of the peace agreement.

The IGAD later on issued a statement saying there were no restrictions in place against Machar and that the South Sudanese vice president was free to visit anywhere of his choice. A few days later, Gatwech accused Machar of intentionally refusing to visit him and in June, an attempt to remove the opposition's military intelligence chief, Dhiling Keah Chuol, by Gatwech let to a rumored removal of Gatwech as chief of staff.

Days later, President Kiir appointed Gatwech as presidential envoy on peace after nomination by Machar. Machar's office later on announced that Gatwech had been replaced as chief of staff of the opposition military deepening the disagreements within the group.

The Declaration 
On August 4, 2021, Gatwech issued a communiqué following a meeting of opposition commanders at Kitgwang in Magenis, a northern-most town bordering Sudan, declaring that Machar had been removed as the leader of the SPLM-IO and that he has assumed power as the new opposition leader.

Machar responded with another communiqué following a meeting of the SPLM-IO Political Bureau in Juba, the capital of South Sudan, and then accused unnamed "peace spoilers" of engineering the opposition split.

Resulting fighting 
On August 7, forces from the Tiger Battalion allied to Machar launched an attack on Gatwech's position in Magenis sparking fierce fighting that resulted in the killing of at least 28 soldiers from both sides. There were also unconfirmed reports of the killing of two senior SPLA-IO commanders allied to Machar.

References

South Sudanese activists
Peace processes